IGY  may refer to:

Immunoglobulin Y (IgY), a type of antibody found in birds but not mammals
International Geophysical Year (I. G. Y.)
"I.G.Y. (What a Beautiful World)", a 1982 song by Donald Fagen
Israel Gay Youth
 Ingenuity (helicopter) (ICAO operator code: IGY), NASA solar-powered autonomous drone helicopter on Mars

See also 

 Iggy (disambiguation)
 IGI (disambiguation)
 IG (disambiguation)
 GY (disambiguation), for 1 Gy
 GM LGY engine